Arab identity is the objective or subjective state of perceiving oneself as an Arab and as relating to being Arab. Like other cultural identities, it relies on a common culture, a traditional lineage, the common land in history, shared experiences including underlying conflicts and confrontations. These commonalities are regional and in historical contexts, tribal. Arab identity is defined independently of religious identity, and pre-dates the spread of Islam and before spread of Judaism and Christianity, with historically attested Arab Muslim tribes and Arab Christian tribes and Arab Jewish tribes. Arabs are a diverse group in terms of religious affiliations and practices. Most Arabs are Muslim, with a minority adhering to other faiths, largely Christianity, but also Druze and Baháʼí.

Arab identity can also be seen through a lens of national, regional or local identity. Throughout Arab history, there have been three major national trends in the Arab world. Pan-Arabism rejects the individual Arab states' existing sovereignty as artificial creations and calls for full Arab unity.

History

The Arabs are first mentioned in the mid-ninth century BCE as a people living in eastern and southern Syria, and the north of the Arabian Peninsula.

The Arabs appear to have been under the vassalage of the Neo-Assyrian Empire (911–605 BCE), and the succeeding Neo-Babylonian Empire (605–539 BCE), Persian Achaemenid Empire (539–332 BCE), Greek Macedonian/Seleucid Empire and Parthian Empire. Arab tribes, most notably the Ghassanids and Lakhmids begin to appear in the southern Syrian deserts and southern Jordan from the mid 3rd century CE onwards, during the mid to later stages of the Roman Empire and Sasanian Empire.

All contemporary Arabs were considered as descended from two ancestors, Qahtan and Adnan. During the early Muslim conquests of the 7th and 8th centuries, the Arabs forged the Rashidun and then Umayyad Caliphate, and later the Abbasid Caliphate, whose borders touched southern France in the west, China in the east, Anatolia in the north, and the Sudan in the south. This was one of the largest land empires in history.

Ideology

Arab nationalism

Arab nationalism is a nationalist ideology that asserts the Arabs are a nation and promotes the unity of Arab people. In its contemporary conception, it is the belief that the Arab people are a people united by language, culture, ethnicity, history, geography and interests, and that one Arab nation will assemble the Arabs within its borders from the Atlantic Ocean to the Arabian Sea.

Many Arabs believe that they are an old nation, exhibiting pride, for example, based on Arabic poetry and other forms of Arabic literature. In the era of the spread of Islam, nationalism was manifested by the identification of Arabs as a distinct nation within Islamic countries. In the modern era, this idea was embodied by ideologies such as Nasserism and Ba'athism, which were common forms of nationalism in the Arab world, especially in the mid-twentieth century. Perhaps the most important form of creating such an Arab state was the establishment of the United Arab Republic between Egypt and Syria, although it was short-lived. To some extent, Arab nationalism gained a new popular appeal as a result of the Arab Spring of the 2010s, calling for Arab social unity, led by the people on the streets, not the authoritarian regimes that had installed the historic forms of nationalism.

Arab socialism

Arab socialism is a political ideology based on an amalgamation between Arab nationalism and socialism. Arab socialism differs from other socialist ideas prevalent in the Arab world. For many, including Michel Aflaq, one of its founders, Arab socialism was a necessary step towards the consolidation of Arab unity and freedoms, since the socialist system of ownership and development alone could overcome the remnants of colonialism in the Arab world.

Unity

Pan-Arabism

Pan-Arabism is an ideology espousing the unification of the countries of North Africa and Middle East from the Atlantic Ocean to the Arabian Sea, often referred to as the Arab world. The idea is based on the integration of some or all of the Arab countries into a single political and economic framework that removes the borders between the Arab states and establishes a strong economic, cultural and military state. Arab unity is an ideology that Arab nationalists see as a solution to the backwardness, occupation and oppression that the Arab citizens in all the individual states are suffering from.

Arab League

The Arab League, formally the League of Arab States is a regional organization of Arab countries in and around North Africa, the Middle East, the Horn of Africa and the Arabian Peninsula. It was formed in Cairo on 22 March 1945 with six members: Kingdom of Egypt, Kingdom of Iraq, Transjordan (renamed Jordan in 1949), Lebanon, Saudi Arabia, and Syria. Its charter provides for coordination among member states in economic matters, including trade relations, communications, cultural relations, travel documents and permits, social relations and health.

Definition

An Arab can be defined as a member of a Semitic people, inhabiting much of the Middle East and North Africa. The ties that bind Arabs are ethnic, linguistic, cultural, historical, nationalist, geographical, political, often also relating to religion and to cultural identity. In their long history and with many local variations, Arabs have developed their distinct customs, language, architecture, fine art, literature, music, cinema, dance, media, cuisine, dress, societies, and mythology.

According to both Judaism and Islam, Ishmael was the ancestor of the Ishmaelites and of the Arabs. Ishmael was the elder son of Abraham and the forefather of many prominent Arab tribes.

Homeland

The Arab world, formally the Arab homeland, also known as the Arab nation or the Arab states, currently consists of the 22 Arab countries: Algeria, Bahrain, Comoros, Djibouti, Egypt, Iraq, Jordan, Kuwait, Lebanon, Libya, Mauritania, Morocco, Oman, Palestine, Qatar, Saudi Arabia, Somalia, Sudan, Syria, Tunisia, United Arab Emirates and Yemen. They occupy an area stretching from the Atlantic Ocean in the west to the Arabian Sea in the east, and from the Mediterranean Sea in the north to the Horn of Africa and the Indian Ocean in the southeast. In 2019, the combined population of the Arab world was estimated at 423 million inhabitants.

Categories
Arab identity can be described as consisting of many interconnected parts:

Racial

Based on analysis of the DNA of Semitic-speaking peoples, some recent genetic studies have found Y-chromosomal links between modern Semitic-speaking peoples of the Middle East like Arabs, Hebrews, Mandaeans, Samaritans, and Assyrians.

Medieval Arab genealogists divided Arabs into three groups:
"Ancient Arabs" tribes that had vanished or been destroyed.
"Pure Arabs" descending from the Qahtan tribe, who existed before Abraham and Ishmael.
The "Arabized Arabs" descending from Ishmael, the elder son of Abraham through his marriage to Rala bint Mudad ibn Amr ibn Jurhum, an Arab Qahtani woman. Tribes descending from this alliance are also referred to as Adnani tribes.

Centuries later, the "Arabized Arabs" assumed the name "Pure Arabs" and the "Arabized Arabs" description was attributed to other peoples that joined Islam and created alliances with the Arab tribes.

Ethnic

Concentrating on ethnic identity is another way of defining Arab identity, which can be subdivided in linguistic, cultural, social, historical, political, national or genealogical terms. In this approach, "being Arab" is based on one or several of the following criteria:
Genealogy: Someone who can trace his or her ancestry to the Arab tribes, from the Arabian Desert, Syrian Desert and neighboring areas.
Ancestry: belonging to Arab people, inherited from grandparents, or denoting an ancestor or ancestors.
Self-concept: a person who defines himself as "Arab"
Attribution of identity: Someone, who is seen by others as an Arab, based on their notions of ethnicity (for example, people of northern Sudan, who can be seen both as African and/or Arab)
Linguistic: Someone whose first language, and, by extension, cultural expression, is Arabic.
Culture: someone who was brought up with Arab culture
Political: Someone, whose country is a member of the League of Arab States and who shares political associations with the Arab countries. (for example, Somalis and Djiboutians)
Societal: Someone who lives in or identifies with an Arab society
Nationality: one who is a national of an Arab state

National

National identity is one's identity or sense of belonging to one state or to one nation. It is the sense of a nation as a cohesive whole, as represented by distinctive traditions, culture, language and politics. Arab nationalism is a nationalist ideology celebrating the glories of Arab civilization, the language and literature of the Arabs, calling for rejuvenation and political union in the Arab world. The premise of Arab nationalism is the need for an ethnic, political, cultural and historical unity among the Arab peoples of the Arab countries. The main objective of Arab nationalism was to achieve the independence of Western influence of all Arab countries. Arab political strategies with the nation in order to determine the struggle of the Arab nation with the state system (nation-state) and the struggle of the Arab nation for unity. The concepts of new nationalism and old nationalism are used in analysis to expose the conflict between nationalism, national ethnic nationalism, and new national political nationalism. These two aspects of national conflicts highlight the crisis known as the Arab Spring, which affects the Arab world today. Suppressing the political struggle to assert the identity of the new civil state is said to clash with the original ethnic identity.

Religious

Until about the fourth century, almost all Arabs practised polytheistic religions. Although significant Jewish and Christian minorities developed, polytheism remained the dominant belief system in pre-Islamic, most Arabs followed a pagan religion with a number of deities, including Hubal, Wadd, Allāt, Manat, and Uzza. A few individuals, the hanifs, had apparently rejected polytheism in favor of monotheism unaffiliated with any particular religion. Different theories have been proposed regarding the role of Allah in Meccan religion. Today the majority of Arabs are Muslims, identities are often seen as inseparable. The "Verse of Brotherhood" is the tenth verse of the Quranic chapter "Al-Hujurat", is about brotherhood of believers with each other.

However, there were divergent currents in Pan-Arabism - religious and secular. Ba'athism emerged as a secular countercurrent to the pan-Islamist ambitions of political Islam and the Muslim Brotherhood in the 1960s. Secular nationalism and religious fundamentalism have continued to overcome each other to this day. There are also different religious denominations within Islam leading to sectarian conflict and conflict. In fact, the social and psychological distances between Sunni and Shia Muslims may be greater than the perceived distance between different religions. Because of this, Islam can be seen both as a unification and as a force of division in Arab identity.

Cultural

Arab cultural identity is characterized by complete uniformity. Arab cultural space are historically so tightly interwoven. Arab cultural identity has been assessed through four measures that measure the basic characteristics of Arab culture: religiosity, grouping, belief in gender hierarchy and attitudes toward sexual behavior. The results indicate the predominance of the professional strategies that Arab social workers have learned in their training in social work, while indicating the willingness of social workers to benefit from established strategies in their culture and society, either separately or in combination with the professional. There are different aspects of Arab identity, whether ethnic, religious, national, linguistic or cultural - of different fields and analytical angles.

Linguistic

For some Arabs, beyond language, race, religion, tribe or region. Arabic; hence, can be considered as a common factor among all Arabs. Since the Arabic language also exceeds the country's border, the Arabic language helps to create a sense of Arab nationalism. According to the Iraqi world exclusive Cece, "it must be people who speak one language one heart and one soul, so should form one nation and thus one country." There are two sides to the coin, argumentative. While the Arabic language as one language can be a unifying factor, the language is often not united at all. Accents vary from region to region, there are wide differences between written and spoken versions, many countries host bilingual citizens, many Arabs are illiterate. This leads us to examine other identifying aspects of Arabic identity. Arabic, a Semitic language from the Afroasiatic language family. Modern Standard Arabic serves as the standardized and literary variety of Arabic used in writing, as well as in most formal speech, although it is not used in daily speech by the overwhelming majority of Arabs. Most Arabs who are functional in Modern Standard Arabic acquire it through education and use it solely for writing and formal settings.

Political

Arab political identity characterized by restraint, compassion, hospitality, generosity, and proper conduct. Arab countries to redefine politics are linked to the fact that the political culture behind the Arabs has been overrun for centuries by successive political. The vast majority of the citizens of the Arab countries view themselves and are seen by outsiders as "Arabs". Their sense of the Arab nation is based on their common denominators: language, culture, ethnicity, social and political experiences, economic interests and the collective memory of their place and role in history.

The relative importance of these factors is estimated differently by different groups and frequently disputed. Some combine aspects of each definition, as done by Palestinian Habib Hassan Touma:

The Arab League, a regional organization of countries intended to encompass the Arab world, defines an Arab as:

See also

References

Arab culture
Society of the Arab world
Arab nationalism
Collective identity
Identity politics